Kenichi: The Mightiest Disciple is an anime series adapted from the manga of the same title by Syun Matsuena. Produced by TMS Entertainment and directed by Hajime Kamegaki, it was broadcast in Japan on TV Tokyo from October 7, 2006 to September 29, 2007.

The studio Brains Base produced two Original video animations continuing from the Ragnarok Arc and the events that follow. The first OVA was released on March 14, 2012 and the second OVA was released in May 2012. In 2009, Funimation Entertainment licensed the episodes for an English-language release in North America. The series began airing on the Funimation Channel from October 26, 2009 until May 25, 2010. Funimation initially released the series in 4 part DVD sets in 2009 and 2010, and then later re released the series in season sets in 2010 and 2011, with the latest release being under Funimations anime classics label. The series use seven pieces of theme music: two opening themes and five ending themes. From episodes 26-50, the second opening theme is "Yahhoo" by Diva x Diva while the ending themes are Run Over by  Koike Joanna,  by Sakura, and "Be Strong" by Kana Yazumi. The OVAs uses two opening themes. For OVAs 1-9, the opening theme is "Wish" by Iori Nomizu. For OVAs 10-11, the opening theme is Higher ground by Tomokazu Seki.

Episode list

OVA

Home media

References

External links 
 TV Tokyo - Kenichi Homepage 

Kenichi: The Mightiest Disciple
Kenichi: The Mightiest Disciple